Natalis (Saint Naile, Naal) (died 564) was a 6th-century Irish monk and saint.

His father was Aenghus, who was 3rd in descent from Lughaidh, King of Munster. He died in 564. He was a spiritual student of Columba and founded monasteries throughout Ulster, serving as an abbot at St Naul's Abbey, Inver (County Donegal), Kinawley (Cill Naile), Inver Naile (at Raphoe, County Donegal), and Devenish Island, where he succeeded Saint Molaise. 

A well in his memory still exists beside Kinawley Church, where the handle of his bell was preserved up to the 19th century. A Life of Naile dating from c.1520 is found in 'Miscellanea hagiographica Hibernica: vitae adhuc ineditae sanctorum Mac Creiche, Naile, Cranat'.

Natalis' feast day is 27 January.

See also
Kinawley

References

External links
Entry at Patron Saints Index

6th-century Christian saints
6th-century Irish abbots
Medieval saints of Ulster
People from County Tipperary
People from County Fermanagh
564 deaths